Digonophorus elegans is a species of beetles belonging to the family Lucanidae. It is found in India.

References

External links 

 Digonophorus elegans at insectoid.info
 Digonophorus elegans at gbif.org

Lucaninae
Beetles described in 1862
Insects of India